Sangaldan Ramban Railway Station is a proposed railway station in Ramban district, Jammu and Kashmir. Its code is SNGDN. It will serve Sangaldan city and Ramban town. The station proposal includes two platforms. The station lies on Banihal–Katra line. The Work on this rail line is expected to be finished year 2022. The station in surrounded by many of long tunnels of Jammu–Baramulla line.

The station is part of the Jammu–Baramulla line, which once completed, will connect the city to the rail network of India. Currently, services are to Baramulla and Banihal. The railway line once fully completed is expected to increase tourism and travel to the Kashmir Valley. The work of last leg Chenab Bridge is in final stages and is expected to be completed by 2022. 

But Due to delay in the projects the railway station work may be completed by ending 2023.  

This project is being executed by bunch of companies. Few of them are listed below 

KONKAN Railways (Govt. PSU)

IRCON International Ltd. (Indian Railway Construction Ltd.)

Savronik Piscesia JV 

Hitech Erectors pvt. ltd.  

RK InfraCrop Pvt. Ltd.

Rishi Construction Company

Patel engg.

This railway station plays an important role as it connects Udhampur to Srinagar railway station. Which helps in ease of transportation of goods and military equipment.

References

Railway stations in Ramban district
Firozpur railway division
Proposed railway stations in India